Luis Marcelo Herrera (born 26 February 1992) is an Argentine professional footballer who plays as a centre-back for Deportes La Serena.

Career
Herrera had youth spells with Club Ledesma and Nueva Chicago before joining Lanús. His Lanús senior career began in 2012, he was an unused substitute for a win over San Martín in the Argentine Primera División on 15 November. His professional debut arrived later in the 2012–13 season, on 11 March 2013, against Arsenal de Sarandí. He made two more appearances in all competitions for Lanús, prior to leaving on loan in July 2014 to play for Torneo Federal A's Talleres. Fourteen appearances followed as the club were beaten in a promotion play-off final. On 19 January 2015, Herrera joined Primera División side Olimpo on loan.

His first senior goal came in his tenth appearance versus Gimnasia y Esgrima on 3 October. In total, Herrera scored one goal in fourteen games for Olimpo. He went on to play forty-three times over the following two seasons for Lanús, whilst also scoring his first goal for the club during a 4–2 victory against Banfield in April 2017. January 2019 saw Herrera sign for Belgrano.

Career statistics
.

Honours
Lanús
Argentine Primera División: 2016
Copa Bicentenario: 2016
Supercopa Argentina: 2016

References

External links

1992 births
Living people
Sportspeople from Jujuy Province
Argentine footballers
Argentine expatriate footballers
Association football defenders
Club Atlético Lanús footballers
Talleres de Córdoba footballers
Olimpo footballers
Club Atlético Belgrano footballers
Defensa y Justicia footballers
Godoy Cruz Antonio Tomba footballers
Deportes La Serena footballers
Argentine Primera División players
Torneo Federal A players
Chilean Primera División players
Argentine expatriate sportspeople in Chile
Expatriate footballers in Chile